The Hive, is a large golden-coloured building in Worcester, England, which houses the fully integrated Worcestershire County Council, City of Worcester public library, the University of Worcester's academic library, Worcestershire Record Office, the county Archive and Worcestershire Archaeology Service.

History
The Hive was procured under a private finance initiative programme and was built by Galliford Try at a cost of £60 million. The Hive's joint commissioning clients were the University of Worcester and Worcestershire County Council. Funding was also provided by the National Lottery and the British government's Department for Culture, Media and Sport and Department for Education. It was opened to the public on 2 July 2012 and officially opened by Queen Elizabeth II on 12 July 2012.

Visitors
The library houses over a quarter of a million books. According to the Annual Public Library Statistics from the Chartered Institute of Public Finance and Accountancy (CIPFA), The Hive issued 903,859 books during the financial year 2013/14 and achieved 978,199 visits. This placed it in first position in the West Midlands.

Awards
Awards include:
Best new-build project of the year in the Chartered Institute of Building Services Engineers (CIBSE) Building Performance Awards 2013
Sustainable Project of the Year in the Building Awards 2013
Outstanding Library Team - Times Higher Leadership and Management Award - June 2013 
Sustainable Project of the Year - Building Magazine - April 2013
Civic Trust Award - March 2013
Contribution to the local community through The Hive - Guardian University Award - February 2013
New build project of the year (value above £5 million) - CIBSE - February 2013
Building Excellence Award - South Worcestershire Building Control -  2012
BREEAM Outstanding 86.4% - June 2012
Best Sustainability in a Project- Public Private Partnership Awards - May 2012

Further reading
Better Public Libraries; Commission for Architecture and the Built Environment; 2003
RIBA Journal; April 2012 
CIBSE Journal; March 2013

References

External links
 The Hive website
 University of Worcester, Library Services
 Architects : Feilden Clegg Bradley Studios
 Engineers : Max Fordham
 

Buildings and structures in Worcester, England
Libraries established in 2012
Libraries in Worcestershire